is a railway station on the Kagoshima Main Line operated by JR Kyushu in Higashi-ku, Fukuoka City, Fukuoka Prefecture, Japan. The name of the station was officially announced by JR Kyushu on September 24, 2008.</ref> It is the nearest station of Kyushu Sangyo University. The station name means, literally, "in front of Kyushu Sangyo University".

Lines

Layout
The station consists of two opposed side platforms serving two tracks.

Adjacent stations

History
The station was opened by JR Kyushu on 11 March 1989 as an added station on the existing Kagoshima Main Line track.

Passenger statistics
In fiscal 2016, the station was used by 7,520 passengers daily, and it ranked 22nd among the busiest stations of JR Kyushu.

See also 
List of railway stations in Japan

References

External links
Kyūsanda-imae (JR Kyushu)

Railway stations in Fukuoka Prefecture
Railway stations in Japan opened in 1989